David Català Jiménez (born 3 May 1980) is a Spanish former professional footballer who played as a central defender, currently a manager.

After beginning his career at Espanyol, he spent most of it in Segunda División, representing six teams over nine seasons in the division, mostly Salamanca and Celta. He totalled 274 games and 15 goals in that tier.

Club career
Born in Barcelona, Catalonia, Català began his career at hometown club RCD Espanyol. He made his senior debut on 16 May 1999, playing the entirety of the reserves' 3–0 home win over Palamós CF in the Segunda División B. He first appeared in La Liga with the first team the following 6 May, as a 43rd-minute substitute for Cristóbal in a 2–0 away loss against CD Numancia.

After leaving for Xerez CD of Segunda División in 2003, Català spent each of the next four seasons at a different team in that level, culminating in Lorca Deportiva CF's relegation in 2007. He remained for two years in the same league with UD Salamanca, before joining fellow top-tier side RC Celta de Vigo on a three year-deal on 23 June 2009; he was recommended by Miguel Torrecilla, the sporting director who made the same move earlier in the summer, and was the second player to be acquired that window after Cristian Bustos.

Català scored in the Galician derby on 15 April 2012 seven minutes after entering in place of Hugo Mallo, albeit in a 3–2 loss to Deportivo de La Coruña at Balaídos. The campaign nonetheless ended in top-flight promotion, with him contributing 18 games and two goals to the feat.

On 28 July 2012, after recently signing a new contract, Català rescinded it and moved abroad for the first time, signing a three-year deal at AEK Larnaca FC of the Cypriot First Division. He helped the side win the 2017–18 Cypriot Cup at the age of 38, and retired the following year.

Catalá was appointed manager of his last club in May 2021, replacing Sofronis Avgousti on a two-year contract. On 12 August 2022, he continued in the same league by signing a one-year deal with Apollon Limassol FC.

Club statistics

Managerial statistics

Honours
AEK Larnaca
Cypriot Cup: 2017–18
Cypriot Super Cup: 2018

References

External links

Celta de Vigo biography 

1980 births
Living people
Spanish footballers
Footballers from Barcelona
Association football defenders
La Liga players
Segunda División players
Segunda División B players
RCD Espanyol B footballers
RCD Espanyol footballers
Xerez CD footballers
UE Lleida players
Albacete Balompié players
Lorca Deportiva CF footballers
UD Salamanca players
RC Celta de Vigo players
Cypriot First Division players
AEK Larnaca FC players
Spanish expatriate footballers
Expatriate footballers in Cyprus
Spanish expatriate sportspeople in Cyprus
Spanish football managers
Cypriot First Division managers
AEK Larnaca FC managers
Apollon Limassol FC managers
Spanish expatriate football managers
Expatriate football managers in Cyprus